The Maliya Miyana–Wankaner morbi ghantila mg line belongs to Western Railway of Rajkot Division in Gujarat State.

History
Later it was extended to Maliya Miyana before the 1940s. Sir Lakhdhiraji Thakor who ruled from 1922 until 1948. Sir Lakhdiraji acted as a ruler, manager, patron and policeman of the state with great authority. Sir Lakhdiraji, like other contemporary rulers of Saurashtra, built roads and a railway network (of seventy miles), connecting Wadhwan and Morbi and the two small ports of Navlakhi and Vavania to export salt and cloth. It was the last steam engine hauled section in India. Before railbuses took over on Wankaner-Morvi, there were two-coach trains hauled by YG or YP steam locos (these were the last steam-hauled trains on those routes). Running of Steam trains stopped in April 1999.

Gauge conversion
Gauge conversion of Maliya–Miyana section was taken up in 1996–97. Conversion to Indian gauge was completed in the year 2001.

Freight
Maliya Miyana–Wankaner section is mainly a freight line for salt transportation from Dahinsar. Due to income in freight this line is not closed otherwise it would have been closed. Less passenger trains pass through this line.

References

5 ft 6 in gauge railways in India
Railway lines in Gujarat

1890 establishments in India
Western Railway zone